La Portada (Spanish: "The Gateway") is a natural arch on the coast of Chile,  north of Antofagasta. It is one of fifteen natural monuments included among the protected areas of Chile.

There is another similar but smaller structure in the spa town of Pucatrihue, Osorno Province.

Description 

The La Portada Natural Monument covers an area of 31.27 hectares (77.27 acres), and its geomorphological features and remaining fossils stand out in the form of an arch.

The arch of La Portada is 43 m (140 ft) high, 23 m (75 ft) wide, and 70 m (230 ft) long. It has a base of black andesite stone, around which are arranged marine sedimentary rocks, a stratum of yellowing sandstone, and layers of the remaining fossils of shells dating back 35 to 2 million years ago. All this was formed during a long process of marine erosion.

The arch is surrounded by coastal cliffs that were also formed by marine erosion. They reach a maximum height of 52 m above sea level.

On 5 October 1990, it was declared a natural monument under Supreme Decree #51 of the Ministry of Agriculture, published in the Diario Oficial.

Since March 2003, this natural monument remains closed due to a landslide of an important part of its cliffs, which blocked access to its beach. For this reason, a remodeling of the access route and its surroundings is planned.

Fauna 
The natural monument constitutes an observation site for guano birds such as Peruvian booby (Sula variegata) and Inca terns (Larosterna inca), as well as Guanay cormorants (Phalacrocorax bougainvillii), kelp gulls (Larus dominicanus), grey gulls (Larus modestus), Belcher's gulls (Larus belcheri), and pelicans.

Occasionally one can also observe mammals such as the South American fur seal (Arctocephalus australis) or the common dolphin (Delphinus delphis).

Access 

The monument is found near the Cerro Moreno International Airport and La Chimba National Reserve.

References

External links 

  Corporación Nacional Forestal.
  Servicio Nacional de Turismo.
 La Portada.

Landforms of Antofagasta Region
Natural monuments of Chile
Rock formations of Chile
Natural arches
Protected areas of Antofagasta Region
Coasts of Antofagasta Region